Henry Anthony Hood (3 October 1944 – 26 May 2019) was a Scottish football player and manager.

A forward noted for his skill, he played for Clyde (two spells), Celtic, Motherwell and Queen of the South in Scotland, Sunderland in England and San Antonio Thunder
in the United States. He won eleven domestic honours with Celtic. He later managed Albion Rovers and Queen of the South, and was a businessman involved in the hospitality sector.

Football career

Club
Born in Glasgow and raised in the city's Garthamlock neighbourhood, Hood's older brother Jackie was also a footballer who won the Liverpool Senior Cup while a reserve player at Everton but had returned to Scotland and local Junior club St Roch's by the time his younger sibling was starting his career. Harry Hood initially attended school at St Aloysius' College where rugby union was the chosen sport. Seeking a schoolboy appearance for Scotland, he moved to Holyrood Secondary School but was overlooked for the national schoolboy squad as he had already registered as a senior player at St Roch's.

In summer 1962 he signed for Clyde, making his Scottish Division One debut in November of that year, aged 18. Clyde were relegated to the second tier, but in the lower division Hood flourished, scoring 37 times from 45 appearances in all competitions during the 1963–64 season as the club gained promotion. This good form continued into the next campaign and, after hesitating over a move to Celtic, the team he had supported in childhood, he was transferred to English club Sunderland for a fee of £30,000 in November 1964. In an early outing for the Roker Park club, Hood scored the only goal of the match against Manchester United. 
Hood missed the entire 1965–66 season because he pulled a double hernia in pre-season, and after his recovery, he was in a group of players frozen out by manager Ian McColl. Overall his spell in England was not particularly successful and in October 1966 he returned to Clyde for £13,000. The 1966–67 Scottish Division One season proved to be one of the best in the club's history as they finished in 3rd position, behind only European Cup winners Celtic and European Cup Winners' Cup finalists Rangers. 

Hood signed for Celtic in March 1969 for a £40,000 transfer fee, and quickly established himself in a talented group managed by Jock Stein including the Europe-conquering Lisbon Lions and the emerging highly rated youth players such as Kenny Dalglish dubbed the Quality Street Gang. After playing a part in the team's run to the 1970 European Cup Final, he was not selected for the match in Milan as Celtic lost to Feyenoord. He scored the winning goal against Rangers in the 1971 Scottish Cup Final replay as Celtic won 2–1, and also scored the first goal in the 1974 Scottish Cup Final, a 3–0 victory over Dundee United.

With Celtic, Hood won six Scottish league championships, three Scottish Cups and two Scottish League Cups; He scored 123 goals in all major competitions for the club. His presence onto the field at Parkhead was often greeted with a 'Hare Krishna' chant. Hood scored a hat-trick in an Old Firm game against Rangers in 1973, a feat that was not repeated until Moussa Dembélé achieved it in 2016.

Hood left Celtic in 1976 and, after short spells with San Antonio Thunder in the NASL and Motherwell, ended his playing career with Dumfries club Queen of the South in season 1977–78. After a spell managing Albion Rovers, Hood returned to Queens in the summer of 1981 as manager, just after the club had been promoted to the First Division.

International
In the 1967 close season Hood was a member of an unofficial Scotland national team which travelled to destinations including Israel, Australia and Canada, winning every match. For many years the tour matches were not recognised as full internationals by the Scottish Football Association as full internationals, even though their opponents Israel and Australia did. A BBC Sport article in June 2020 identified him as one of the best Scottish players to have never played a full international. The SFA announced in October 2021 that some of the tour matches would be reclassified as full internationals, which meant that Hood was posthumously awarded an international cap.

Later years
After his retirement from football, Hood ran a company (named Lisini, incorporating the names of his three children) which owned and ran several public houses and restaurants in the Greater Glasgow area. In 2012, he was inducted into the Clyde FC Hall of Fame.

After a battle with cancer, Hood died around 6:30am on 26 May 2019, aged 74.

Honours

Club
Celtic
Scottish League (6): 1968–69, 1969–70, 1970–71, 1971–72, 1972–73, 1973–74
Scottish Cup (3): 1970–71, 1973–74, 1974–75
Scottish League Cup: 1969–70, 1974–75

Individual
Scottish Division One top goalscorer: 1970–71

References

External links

1944 births
2019 deaths
Scottish footballers
Footballers from Glasgow
People educated at St Aloysius' College, Glasgow
People educated at Holyrood Secondary School
Albion Rovers F.C. managers
Association football forwards
St Roch's F.C. players
Scottish Junior Football Association players
Celtic F.C. players
Clyde F.C. players
Expatriate soccer players in the United States
Motherwell F.C. players
Queen of the South F.C. managers
Queen of the South F.C. players
San Antonio Thunder players
Scotland under-23 international footballers
Scottish expatriate footballers
Scottish Football League managers
Scottish Football League players
Scottish Football League representative players
Scottish football managers
Sunderland A.F.C. players
English Football League players
North American Soccer League (1968–1984) players
Scottish league football top scorers
Scottish expatriate sportspeople in the United States
20th-century Scottish businesspeople
Scotland international footballers